Cat Cove is a cove in the northwestern portion of Salem Harbor in Salem, Massachusetts. The cove is located between Winter Island and Salem Neck. There is a powerplant located on the coast of Salem Neck bordering the southwestern edge of Cat Cove.

Coves of the United States
Bays of Essex County, Massachusetts
Bays of Massachusetts